Paauwe can refer to
 Bas Paauwe (1911–1989), Dutch footballer
 Cees Paauwe (born 1977), Dutch footballer (goalkeeper)
 Mark Paauwe (born ca. 1970), Dutch computer scientist and developer of Dragon1 
 Patrick Paauwe (born 1975), Dutch footballer